Jade Curtis (born 2 May 1990 in Oxford) is a retired British tennis player.

Curtis won four doubles titles on the ITF Circuit in her career. On 15 February 2010, she reached her best singles ranking of world number 325. On 21 September 2009, she peaked at world number 230 in the doubles rankings.

Curtis competed in the main draw of the Wimbledon doubles in 2007 and 2009, losing in the first round.

She started playing tennis at the age of seven. Her favourite surface is hardcourt. 

Curtis retired from tennis in 2015.

ITF Circuit finals

Singles: 1 (runner-up)

Doubles: (4 titles, 7 runner-ups)

References

External links
 
 

1990 births
Living people
Sportspeople from Oxford
British female tennis players
English female tennis players
Tennis people from Oxfordshire